56–60 Low Petergate is a grade II* listed building in the city centre of York, in England.

The building was constructed in about 1500 as a terrace of five houses on the north-east side of Low Petergate, for John Stockdale.  It is of three storeys, and is five bays long, with timber framing and a jettied front.  In about 1630, it was redivided into the current three properties, with chimneys and an attic storey added, and extensions at the rear of each property.  In the early-19th century, 56 Low Petergate was refronted in brick, while further brick extensions were added to the rear of 58 and 60 Low Petergate.  The bay windows at the front of 58 and 60 Low Petergate date from around 1800, and the shopfront of 56 is also 19th-century, the other buildings having 20th-century shopfronts.

Inside, some early fixtures and fittings survive, including the 17th-century top section of the staircase in 56, and there is a 17th-century plaster overmantel on the first floor, displaying the Stuart coat of arms.  There is also a 17th-century cupboard door on the second floor, while other doors date from the 18th-century.  In 58, there is a ground floor room with 18th-century panelling, and on the first floor there is an 18th-century overmantel, while in 60, there is a first floor room with 18th-century panelling.

The building was grade II* listed in 1954.

References

Low Petergate 56-60
Buildings and structures completed in 1500
Low Petergate, 56-60
Timber framed buildings in Yorkshire